Peter Donaghy (born 13 January 1898) was an English professional footballer who played as a forward for Middlesbrough, Bradford City and Carlisle United.

Career
Born in Grangetown, Donaghy moved from Grangetown St Mary's to Middlesbrough in August 1919, making his debut (against future club Bradford City) on 24 April 1920. He made a total of 30 appearances for Middlesbrough in the Football League. He joined Bradford City in May 1923. He made 22 appearances in the Football League for Bradford City, scoring 5 goals; he also made 1 appearance in the FA Cup. He joined Carlisle United in June 1925.

After retiring as a player, Donaghy worked as a coach in the Netherlands, managing Sparta, VUC and AFC. He later worked as a steel worker back in his native Teesside.

Personal life
His brothers John and Ted were also professional players.

Sources

References

1898 births
Year of death missing
English footballers
English football managers
Middlesbrough F.C. players
Bradford City A.F.C. players
Carlisle United F.C. players
English Football League players
Association football forwards
English expatriate sportspeople in the Netherlands
Sparta Rotterdam managers
English expatriate football managers
Expatriate football managers in the Netherlands